Doe Bay, Washington is a small unincorporated community in San Juan County, Washington, United States. Doe Bay sits on the south-eastern shore of Orcas Island and is home to Doe Bay Resort and Retreat, where the guest rooms include cabins, yurts, campsites, and a treehouse.

It is also very near Moran State Park. It hosts an annual music festival.

References

External links
 Doe Bay Resort and Retreat
 Welcome to Doe Bay!
 Doe Bay Resort and Retreat reviews on Trip Advisor

Unincorporated communities in San Juan County, Washington
Unincorporated communities in Washington (state)